Acidogona is a genus of tephritid  or fruit flies in the family Tephritidae.

Species
Acidogona dichromata (Snow, 1894)
Acidogona melanura (Loew, 1873)
Acidogona pendula Norrbom, 2010
Acidogona stecki Norrbom, 2010

References

Tephritinae
Tephritidae genera